Laldevin (also Romanized as Laldevīn; also known as La‘ledbīn) is a village in Roshanabad Rural District, in the Central District of Gorgan County, Golestan Province, Iran. At the 2006 census, its population was 557, in 131 families.

References 

Populated places in Gorgan County